Pelletan is a French surname. Notable people with the surname include:

 Camille Pelletan  (1846–1915), French politician and journalist
 Eugène Pelletan (1813–1884), French writer, journalist and politician
 Louis Pelletan, Governor General of Pondicherry in the Second French Colonial Empire
 Philippe-Jean Pelletan (1747–1829), French surgeon and member of the French Academy of Sciences

See also
 Pelletan Point, a headland of Graham Land, Antarctica

French-language surnames